William John Chapman Benson (1818 – 3 December 1850) was a British-born trader who came to Canada where he established himself in the Quebec timber trade.

Benson was born in London in 1818 to parents Thomas and Sarah Benson. He was named after a brother who died as an infant.

Benson quickly established himself as a prominent capitalist in the Quebec commercial community. He was involved in the British North American Electric Telegraph Association as well as the Quebec and Melbourne Railway Company.

References

 Biography at the Dictionary of Canadian Biography Online

English emigrants to pre-Confederation Canada
Canadian businesspeople
Businesspeople from London
1818 births
1850 deaths
19th-century English businesspeople